The Museum im Bellpark is a forum for photography, history, and art in Kriens, Switzerland. It has existed since 1991.

The Museum maintains an archive that documents the development of Kriens from a village to an conurbation, and is building up a collection of Swiss drawings. Its focus is on photography, and it regularly organizes exhibitions. The Museum is supported by the Museum im Bellpark association.

Photographic archive
The Museum im Bellpark maintains an archive with photographs by various photographers from Kriens:
Emil Kreis, (1895–1925), architectural photography, object photography, industrial photography
Franz Schütz, (1940––1980), documentation of Kriens, architectural photography
Otto Pfeifer, (1935–1990), architectural photography, industrial photography, portrait photography
Heinz Schwarz, (1970 to date), Kriens documentation, architectural photography, documentary photography
Mario Kunz, (1985 to date), cityscapes of Kriens, architectural photography, object photography

Publications
Slopes & Houses, Georg Aerni, 2002, Museum im Bellpark, Eikon
Fabrik und Atelier. Menschen und Dinge, Emil Kreis, 2000, Museum im Bellpark, Kriens
Waldhüttenbilder. Kinderhüttentext, 2000, Museum im Bellpark, Kriens
Krienser Ansichten, photographed by Heinz Schwarz, 1999, Museum im Bellpark, Kriens
Fotografien, Otto Pfeifer, Museum im Bellpark, Kriens, 1998
Kriens in alten Ansichten, Museum im Bellpark, Kriens, 1991

External links
 Official website  (in German)

Bellpark
Bellpark
1991 establishments in Switzerland